Saw Mya Kan (}) was a principal queen of King Sithu II of the Pagan Dynasty of Myanmar (Burma). She was the mother of King Htilominlo.

Chronicles say that Htilominlo's mother was a daughter of a gardener, and not Queen Mya Kan. But inscriptional evidence shows that Queen Mya Kan was the mother of Zeya Theinkha (personal name of Htilominlo) and Saw Min Hla.

References

Bibliography
 
 
 
 

Queens consort of Pagan
13th-century Burmese women
12th-century Burmese women